Ina Deltcheva (born 20 July 1977 in Plovdiv; alternate transliteration: Ina Delcheva) is a Bulgarian rhythmic gymnast. She won a silver medal in the group all-around at the 1996 Summer Olympics.

References 

1977 births
Living people
Bulgarian rhythmic gymnasts
Gymnasts at the 1996 Summer Olympics
Olympic gymnasts of Bulgaria
Olympic silver medalists for Bulgaria
Olympic medalists in gymnastics
Medalists at the 1996 Summer Olympics
Sportspeople from Plovdiv
Medalists at the Rhythmic Gymnastics World Championships